Zohreh Tabatabai is an Iranian diplomat and international business coordinator. She served in the United Nations as chief of the "Focal Point for women for the United Nations system" and in the International Labour Organization (ILO) in Geneva as a senior member of the Director's Cabinet and as the Director of Communications. After her ILO assignment, Tabatabai established Quince Partners, an enterprise dealing with communications and public relations.

Tabatabai is represented on many NGOs, non-profit institutions, and charitable establishments which deal with human rights and women's empowerment. She was also a member of the End Human Trafficking Now (EHTN) campaign founded in 2006.

Biography
Zohreh Tabatabai, an Iranian by birth, worked initially as a diplomat for 10 years in the Ministry of Foreign Affairs of Iran. She then joined the United Nations (UN) in 1980 and held several key positions over a period of 20 years, including chief of the Public Services Section and three years as chief of the Focal Point for women for the United Nations system. She was in charge of 85 staff members who assisted her in managing the media, publicity including release of publications, web management and operation of the library. While in the UN, she served as chief coordinator of the UN's Fiftieth Anniversary Celebration held in New York City. In this capacity, she formulated new strategies in public-private cooperation and coordinated with more than 100 heads of state.

Tabatabai worked to improve the cause of women working in the UN by enhancing employment and promotion opportunities at a time when recruitment and retrenchment actions were adversely affecting the career of women employees. On her role in the UN, she said, "The Focal Point should travel to other duty stations and peacekeeping missions to ensure that the message of the Secretary-General's commitment to gender equality is emphasized". In the capacity of Chief of the Public Services Section in the UN, she ensured the  participation of external agencies to enhance the UN's "visibility and effectiveness across a broad range of initiatives".

In 2002 she moved to Geneva to take up the post of Director of Communications in the (Communications Adviser) Director General's Cabinet of the International Labour Organization (ILO). In 2010 she left ILO and formed Quince Partners, an enterprise dealing with communications and public relations. Through this company she not only facilitated many firms to coordinate in an effective manner with the clients, but also encouraged them share their earnings as a positive contribution for the welfare activities of the "Corporate Social Responsibility"(CSR).

Through her networking skills, Tabatabai is now engaged in creating leadership among women in enterprises in the arts, entertainment, science, technology, finance, and government. She has held "salon events" for women in Beijing, Geneva, Paris, Madrid, New York City, Chicago, Washington, D.C., London, Milan, and Istanbul, and has created an "online platform" of salon participants to enhance global cooperation.

References

Living people
Iranian officials of the United Nations
International Labour Organization people
Year of birth missing (living people)
Place of birth missing (living people)
Iranian women diplomats